Bernard Anthony Harris Jr. (born June 26, 1956) is a former NASA astronaut. On February 9, 1995, Harris became the first African American to perform an extra-vehicular activity (spacewalk), during the second of his two Space Shuttle flights.

Education
Harris graduated from Sam Houston High School in San Antonio, Texas, in 1974, where he was actively involved in science fairs, book clubs and other school activities.  He received a B.S. degree in biology from University of Houston in 1978. He earned his MD degree from Texas Tech University Health Sciences Center School of Medicine in 1982. Harris completed a residency in internal medicine at the Mayo Clinic in 1985. Harris is a member of Kappa Alpha Psi fraternity.

Harris completed a National Research Council Fellowship at NASA's Ames Research Center in 1987. While at Ames, he conducted research in musculature physiology and disuse.

He also trained as a flight surgeon at the Aerospace School of Medicine at Brooks Air Force Base in San Antonio in 1988. Dr. Harris received a master's degree in biomedical science from The University of Texas Medical Branch in 1996, and an MBA from the University of Houston (1999). Harris is also a licensed private pilot and certified scuba diver.

After completing his fellowship at NASA Ames, he joined NASA's Johnson Space Center as a clinical scientist and flight surgeon, where he conducted clinical investigations of space adaptation and developed countermeasures for extended duration space flight.

He was the first African American man to go in space as one of NASA's research teams and he was involved in the construction of the space rovers.

He now has a school dedicated to him. The school's name is Dr. Bernard A. Harris Middle School.

Organizations and honors
Harris is a member of many professional, academic and service organizations, including the American College of Physicians, Honor Society of Phi Kappa Phi, and Kappa Alpha Psi Fraternity. He is a board member of the Boys and Girls Club of Houston, National Math and Science Initiative, Medical Informatics, Technology and Applications Center, Houston Technology Center, and the National Space Biomedical Research Institute, Board of Scientific Counselors. He has been recognized several times by NASA and other organizations for his professional and academic achievements. In 1996 he received an honorary doctorate from the Morehouse College School of Medicine. He later received honorary doctorates from Stonybrook University, New Jersey Institute of Technology, and the University of Houston. He has also received a NASA Space flight medal, a NASA Award of Merit, a fellow of the American College of Physicians and the 2000 Horatio Alger Award.

In 2005, the North East Independent School District in San Antonio, Texas named a middle school under construction after Harris. Bernard Harris Middle School opened August 14, 2006, to have a capacity of 1500 students.

Astronaut experience
Harris first became interested in being an astronaut watching the Apollo 11 mission on TV in 1969.
Selected by NASA in January 1990, Harris became an astronaut in July 1991, and qualified for assignment as a mission specialist on future Space Shuttle flight crews. He served as the crew representative for Shuttle Software in the Astronaut Office Operations Development Branch. Harris was assigned as a mission specialist on STS-55, Spacelab D-2, in August 1991.  He flew on board Columbia for ten days, (26 April 1993 – 6 May 1993); on the mission the Shuttle reached one year of accumulated flight time. Harris was part of the payload crew of Spacelab D-2, conducting a variety of research in physical and life sciences. During this flight, Harris logged over 239 hours and 4,164,183 miles in space.

His second mission was as the payload commander on STS-63 ( February 2, 1995 – February 11, 1995), the first flight of the new joint Russian-American Space Program. Mission highlights included the first rendezvous (but not docking) with the Russian space station Mir and retrieval of Spartan 204 satellite. During the flight, Harris became the first African-American to walk in space, while fellow astronaut Michael Foale became the first British-born spacewalker. (It was also on this flight that Eileen Collins became the first female Shuttle pilot.) On this mission, Harris logged 198 hours, 29 minutes in space, completed 129 orbits, and traveled over 2.9 million miles.

Post-NASA career
Harris left NASA in April 1996, but has continued research.  He served as Vice President of SPACEHAB, Inc., and innovative space commercialization company, where he directed the company's space science business. He also served as Vice President of Business Development for Space Media, Inc., an Informatics company, establishing an e-commerce initiative that is now part of the United Nations' education program.

In the late 1990s, Harris served as a member of the Board of Regents of the Texas Tech University System.

In 1998, he founded The Harris Foundation, a Houston, Texas-based non-profit organization, whose stated mission is "to invest in community-based initiatives to support education, health and wealth. THF supports programs that empower individuals, in particular minorities and other economically and/or socially disadvantaged, to recognize their potential and pursue their dreams."

In 2007, Dr. Harris joined the board of the National Math and Science Initiative.

In 2008, he appeared in Microsoft's "I'm a P.C." ad campaign. Harris also gave a keynote speech at the Exxon Mobil Texas State Science and Engineering Fair.

In 2009, he was elected Vice President of the American Telemedicine Association. He was elected President of the American Telemedicine Association in 2011, serving for a one-year term that ended in 2012.

In 2010, he was part of the Dream Tour where he travelled to over 30 schools around the country.

Currently, Dr. Harris is CEO of the National Math and Science Initiative and President and Chief Executive Officer of Vesalius Ventures, Inc., a venture capital accelerator, that invests in early-stage companies in Medical Informatics and Technology.

As of April 19, 2021, Harris serves on the board of directors for commercial aerospace and weapons manufacturer Raytheon Technologies.

Got honorary degree from USciences in 2021.

See also
see the List of African-American astronauts

References

External links

Spacefacts biography of Bernard A. Harris Jr.
Biography at The Harris Foundation

1956 births
Living people
People from Temple, Texas
African-American physicians
American physicians
People from San Antonio
Texas Tech University Health Sciences Center alumni
Texas Tech University System regents
University of Houston alumni
NASA civilian astronauts
Space Shuttle program astronauts
Physician astronauts
Spacewalkers
21st-century African-American people
20th-century African-American people